The Korea Institute of Science and Technology (KIST; Korean: 한국과학기술연구원) is a multi-disciplinary research institute located in Seoul, South Korea. Founded in 1966, it was the first multi-disciplinary scientific research institute in Korea and has contributed significantly to the economic development of the country, particularly during the years of accelerated growth in the 1970s and 1980s. It has a research staff of over 1,800 research scientists, visiting scientists, fellows and trainees, and foreign scientists involved in basic research in various fields of science and technology.

History
The Korea Institute of Science and Technology was established in 1966 under the auspices of Korean and US governments. The mission of KIST was to assume a central role as the first comprehensive research agency for the promotion of the nation's economic growth and the modernization of engineering fields. It has since developed into the foremost R&D organization and the foundation of technological development in Korea. By concentrating on urgently needed technological development during the early stages of Korea's industrialization, KIST contributed to the modernization of industry and helped push ahead a period of rapid, remarkable economic growth for Korea. In addition, over the years KIST has produced a pool of premier S&T talent and spun off numerous specialized research institutes. These accomplishments have guaranteed its continued role as Korea's leading S&T institute.

Headquarters and branch institutes

KIST (Headquarters)
KIST's headquarters and main campus is located in the northern area of Seoul in the neighborhood of Hawolgok-dong, Seongbuk-gu. KIST opened its branch institutes in Gangeung and Jeonbuk to ensure collaboration between universities, research institutes, and industry in specialized areas of R&D in these respective regions. It has also established a branch in Germany to foster international cooperation with European countries.

KIST Gangneung
KIST Gangnueng was established to lead the industrialization of the Gangwon region by providing core technologies and generating cutting-edge, specialized industries. It focuses on specialized areas of research for local adaption including the development of physiological activating materials from the natural products of the Sea of Japan Rim region and the research for environmental conservation of the Gangwon region.

KIST Jeonbuk
KIST Jeonbuk was established in 2008 in Wanju, Jeollabuk-do with the specific goal to lead the development of the composite materials industry.

KIST Europe
KIST Europe, which was established in Saarbruecken, Germany, in 1996, has been playing an important role in broadening international relationships in the field of basic and applied research. The main goals of KIST Europe are the creation of a forum for technical and economic cooperation between Europe and Korea, the development of a global network for the promotion of scientific and technological cooperation with European countries and the contribution for the development of innovative pollution-control technologies. It also focuses its research on microfluidics & clinical diagnostics and interdisciplinary human biotechnology.

Indo-Korea Science and Technology Center
Indo-Korea Science and Technology Center, Bangalore was established in Bengaluru, India, in 2010 with the specialized goal to build a Global Knowledge Platform (GKP) in the field of science and technology between Korea and India.

Organization and administration
KIST is a government-supported research institute under the aegis of the Ministry of Science ICT and future planning. The institute administration consists of a president, vice president, and auditor. The current president is Dr. Byung-kwon Lee, who received his master's and doctoral degrees in chemical engineering at the University of Akron. The administrative departments include Research Planning & Coordination Division, Technology Transfer Division, International Cooperation Division, Administration Division, Security Technology Development Group, and the Technology Policy Research Institute.

Research institutes and divisions
There are two research institutes and two research divisions at KIST including the Brain Science Institute, the Biomedical Research Institute, the Future Convergence Research Division, and the National Agenda Research Division.

Brain Science Institute
The human brain is a highly complex system often dubbed a miniature universe. Its many mysteries have yet to be unveiled. The Brain Science Institute specializes in convergence research encompassing biology, chemistry, nanotechnology, information technology and computer engineering through which it aims to understand the neural mechanism responsible for controlling human behavior and to discover the clues to the tools for overcoming brain dysfunctions. The objective of the Brain Science Institute is to unravel the mysteries of the brain and thereby develop into the hub of the world's brain science research.

 Center for Neuroscience
 Center for Functional Connectomics
 Center for Neuro-Medicine
 Center for BioMicrosystems

Biomedical Research Institute
With the rapid aging of today's society, it has become vital to look for ways to enable humans to maintain a good quality of life for a longer period of time. KIST Biomedical Research Institute is responsible for developing cognitive and motor rehabilitation technology for the elderly and disabled. It also conducts research for cutting-edge devices and materials to replace human tissues and organs as well as innovative medical technology (personalized medicine) for more effective diagnosis and treatment of different diseases. The Biomedical Research Institute is at the forefront of Korea's healthcare and medical welfare research.

 Center for Bionics
 Center for Biomaterials
 Center for Theragnosis

Future Convergence Research Division
The buzzword in the 21st century is technological convergence. Convergence of different technological systems is an engine for future growth, spurring a drive for creativity and remapping today's knowledge, technology and industries. The Future Convergence Research Division aims to reinforce national competitiveness and contribute to KIST's positioning as the global leader of technological convergence research by interlinking biotechnology, nanotechnology and information technology.

 Spin Device Research Center
 Nanomaterials Research Center
 Nanophotonics Research Center
 Interfacial Engineering Research Center
 High Temperature Energy Materials Research Center
 Nanohybrids Research Center
 Electronic Materials Research Center
 Biomolecular Functional Research Center
 Computational Science Research Center
 Center for Nanosystems*
 Nanomaterials Technology Development Center*
 Center for Traditional Science & Technology*
 Center for Metals & Materials Reliability Evaluation*

National Agenda Research Division
The world is faced with many challenges including climate change and ensuring sustainable growth in the future. The National Agenda Research Division was established to contribute to the creation of forward-looking green industries in Korea. It is responsible for the development of renewable energy sources, carbon cycle, water cycle and original technology for robotics. Its eight research centers are designed to maximize the core strengths of different areas such as energy, the environment and systems with an eye to advancing the nation's economic progress through convergence research projects jointly led by its centers.

 Fuel Cell Research Center
 Solar Cell Research Center
 Energy Storage Research Center
 Clean Energy Research Center
 Water Research Center
 Environmental Sensor System Research Center
 Energy Mechanics Research Center
 Imaging Media Research Center
 Interaction and Robotics Research Center
 Center for R-Learning Development, Promotion & Support*

Academic programs
KIST offers a variety of academic programs for students in Korea and from abroad.

UST
The Korea University of Science and Technology (UST) is a graduate-level educational institution founded jointly by 22 government institutes in Korea, including KIST, in various fields of science and technology. The program fosters the development of S&T professionals by taking advantage of the extensive facilities, equipment, personnel, and projects at the member research institutes. Students at UST participate in research projects and industrial site operations to receive in-depth field and research-oriented education and training in their respective major disciplines.

IRDA
KIST founded the International R&D Academy (IRDA) in 2001 as a unique graduate program. This program is open exclusively to promising foreign scientists and engineers. Under the guidance of KIST's experienced scientists, the IRDA offers its students a multidisciplinary, hands-on approach to learning which, in turn, provides expanded opportunities to pursue individual research activities. This approach provides the IRDA student with a challenging and enriching educational experience. The goal of this program is to train and educate prospective foreign scientists and engineers to become leading researchers in academia and industry in their respective countries. Emphasis is specifically placed on transferring KIST's established knowledge and experience in R&D, focusing on innovative technologies and developing R&D management skills. Students admitted to IRDA are registered at UST, as KIST confer degrees through UST. Through this collaboration, students are able to benefit from a research-oriented program and cooperate with 22 national institutes.

As of 2010, about 100 students from over 20 countries including Israel, Russia, Ukraine, and several Asian countries (Bangladesh, China, India, Indonesia, Nepal, Pakistan, Thailand, Vietnam, etc.) were directly involved in research projects at KIST, studying interdisciplinary fusion technologies, materials & devices, robotics & systems, energy, environment and life & health via KIST's mentoring system of training in cutting-edge technology and R&D knowledge. All IRDA students receive full scholarship benefits.

KIST-Academia Collaborative Education Program
This collaborative scheme is a premier S&T educational program which is carried out in partnership with prominent universities in Korea. The program distinguishes itself from other conventional master's and doctoral programs by offering unique research-oriented experiences. Participating students are required to complete their basic coursework at the universities where they are enrolled. After beginning their studies, they may involve themselves simultaneously in research and their thesis/dissertation projects at KIST. KIST researchers, in conjunction with faculty at the students’ respective universities, act as co-advisors.

Star-Postdoctoral Program
KIST has implemented a Star-Postdoctoral Program for international professionals which is intended to attract new global talent in S&T through a year-round application process and a secure verification system. In addition, KIST runs a training program called Postdoctoral Fellow Program to attract young, creative Korean scientists by offering them an opportunity to earn valuable R&D experience and go into academia, R&D society, and industry. With these premier postdoctoral research-fellow recruiting programs, KIST is adding another element to its efforts to ensure a healthy pool of high-quality research personnel who will help expand KIST's capacity and expertise in original technology research.

International cooperation
KIST has been actively promoting international cooperation through joint research projects, scientist exchange programs, and the sponsorship of international workshops and symposia. Cooperative agreements exist with over 70 research institutes in 27 different countries and this number is expected to expand significantly in coming years.

In addition to KIST Europe, KIST has also founded the Indo-Korea Science and Technology Center to utilize India's abundant S&T potential and lay the groundwork for trade cooperation with one of the largest markets in the world. The Indo-Korea Science and technology center (IKST) was established in 2010 and since then IKST has focused on the commercialization of technology developed by KIST, Korea. The IKST has extended its capability to research and development collaboration with India from November 2013. For this Dr. Seung-Cheol Lee, the R&D director has been dispatched from Korea to promote R&D activity in India. Currently projects on computational Material Science and developing user interface for facilitating massive calculations are going on.

KIST is also engaged in transferring to developing countries its experience and the technologies that have led to Korea's successful industrialization. Consistent implementation of the campus globalization initiative is also in progress to create a research environment at KIST that is attractive to scientists from abroad.

Joint Laboratories at KIST
 KIST-SSSA
 KIST Europe Branch Lab

Overseas Joint Laboratories
 KIST-Purdue University
 KIST-Brookhaven National Laboratory

Notable media coverage
Recently, KIST has been gaining significant media attention with its development of the English-teaching robot. It has been selected as one of ’50 Best Inventions of 2010’ by Time magazine and has been featured on CNN and The New York Times.

External links
 Indo-Korea Science and Technology Centre (IKST), Bangalore INDIA, website
 KIST Europe
 KIST Gangneung
 KIST Jeonbuk
 International R&D Academy

References 

Research institutes in South Korea
Multidisciplinary research institutes